Rafael Pietri Oms was Chancellor of the University of Puerto Rico at Mayagüez  from 1974 to 1979.

Hand etched portraits on black granite of Pietri, in youth and old age, by Osvaldo Torres (Cruzacalles), on display at the Mayagüez City Hall

Education
Rafael Pietri Oms completed his bachelor's degree in agricultural sciences in 1942 in the former College of agriculture and mechanical arts of Mayagüez (CAAM). In 1947, he completed his graduate studies in soil chemistry at Texas A&M University From 1953 to 1957, he attended doctoral studies at the University of Missouri.

At the conclusion of his graduate studies, he began to work at the College, where he eventually climbed, with unquestionable merits, all the academic and administrative ranks. He was Professor, director Dean of the College of agricultural sciences and also the third rector of the institution, from 1974 to 1979.

See also
University of Puerto Rico at Mayaguez people

Democratic Party (Puerto Rico) politicians
University of Puerto Rico faculty
Texas A&M University alumni
People from San Germán, Puerto Rico
Puerto Rican academics
1921 births
2011 deaths